This is a list of electoral results for the electoral district of Brunswick West in Victorian state elections.

Members for Brunswick West

The Electoral district of Brunswick was re-created in 1976 with Tom Roper being the member 1976–1992.

Election results

Elections in the 1970s

Elections in the 1960s

 The two candidate preferred vote was not counted between the Labor and DLP candidates for Brunswick West.

Elections in the 1950s

 Two party preferred vote was estimated.

References

Victoria (Australia) state electoral results by district